12/7 may refer to:
December 7 (month-day date notation)
July 12 (day-month date notation)
12 shillings and 7 pence in UK predecimal currency

See also
127 (disambiguation)
7/12 (disambiguation)